Matthew Wilkinson is a British actor, playwright and director.

Acting
Wilkinson trained at the Royal Academy of Dramatic Art and has performed in theatre, film, television and animation.

Early theatre work included Alan Bennett's The Wind in the Willows (Old Vic, 1996) directed by Jeremy Sams, and in 1997 The Warp for Ken Campbell (Barnet), Take Away (Lyric Hammersmith) and The Birds (The Gate). He was also seen in The Gift (BBC) directed by Danny Hiller.

In 1998 he played Torvald in A Doll's House (Harrogate) and performed in Playing Hide and Seek with Jesus by Richard Herring (Pleasance, Edinburgh) directed by Jeremy Herrin. More film work included The Avengers (Warner Bros),  The Jolly Boys' Last Stand with Andy Serkis and Sacha Baron Cohen and The Tichborne Claimant directed by David Yates, both with Bigger Picture Company.

In 1999 David Hayman directed him in Harbour Lights II (BBC) and over the next few years Wilkinson took roles in The Mystery of Men (BBC), It's A Girl Thing (Channel 4), Shackleton (Channel 4), Ali G Inda House and About A Boy (both Working Title).

In 2003 he performed in Hideki Noda's play Red Demon (Young Vic, London). Parts followed in V for Vendetta (Warner Bros.2005), The Message (BBC 2006) and Finkle in Finkle's Odyssey (Large Films, 2006).

In 2011 he played Trigorin in The Seagull at the Arcola Theatre, London with Geraldine James.

Voice
Since 2009 Wilkinson has contributed over 20 characters to Thomas & Friends (HIT Entertainment) including Rocky, Spencer, Kevin, Charlie, Stanley, Scruff, Cranky, Butch and Farmer McColl in the UK dub as well as Rusty, Diesel 10, Merrick, Winston and Ben (since Season 22) in both dubs.

His first animation was playing Weasel on Watership Down (CITV, 1999). Other work includes Empire Square (Channel 4, 2006) created and directed by Dave Rowntree from Blur, The Adventures of Bottle Top Bill and His Best Friend Corky (Channel 5, 2007), Boris, Zed et al. in 64 Zoo Lane (CBBC, 2009), Bunny Maloney in Bunny Maloney (MoonScoop, 2009), Trust Me I'm A Genie (Millimages, 2011), Justin and the Knights of Valor (Kandor, 2013), rude-boy Stevie in The Unbeatables (Universal, 2014) and Mr. Fuzzy in 101 Dalmatian Street (Disney, 2018).

He has narrated Cops With Cameras (ITV) and voiced Scott in Blizzard: Race to the Pole (BBC, 2006).

For gamers he is Murmur in EA's Hellgate:London, Frida in LittleBigPlanet (PS4), Alexander the Great in Total War: Arena and Felix and Gor-Rok in Total War: Warhammer II (both Creative Assembly).

Wilkinson's break in the ad world came when he signed to voice the Be The Best army campaigns of the late 1990s. Since then he has voiced numerous commercials for TV and radio including the iconic If Carlsberg did...

Writing
In 2002 Wilkinson wrote and directed his first play Sun is Shining about a turbulent love affair between a British Chinese city boy and a Glaswegian painter. A sell-out at the Kings Head Theatre, London and BAC Time Out Critics' Choice season (2003), it transferred to the Brits Off Broadway Festival at 59E59 Theaters in New York City in 2004.

In 2003 Wilkinson co-adapted physical theatre piece Red Demon for Japanese performer auteur Hideki Noda. It played at the Young Vic and Theatre Cocoon, Tokyo.

In 2005 he directed Jake Broder in His Royal Hipness Lord Buckley at the Zam Zam Room, Broder's tribute to the legendary swing imposter (PizzaExpress Jazz Club, London).

In 2006 he wrote and directed a short film Lion which screened at festivals in Berlin, Paris and Nashville.

Red Sea Fish (Brighton Dome Studio Theatre and Brits Off Broadway, 59E59 Theaters, New York) was staged in 2009 and a female monologue Just Let Go (Chisenhale Dance Space) in 2012.

In 2015 he wrote and directed My Eyes Went Dark at the Finborough Theatre. Starring Cal MacAninch and Thusitha Jayasundera it was nominated for three Off West End Awards including Best Play. The production transferred to the Traverse Theatre, Edinburgh 2016 and 59E59 Theaters New York 2017.

In 2021 he wrote and directed Psychodrama as a pop-up in North London co-produced with Pádraig Cusack. Nominated for OffWestEnd Awards for Lead Performance in a Play: Emily Bruni and Sound Design: Gareth Fry. Psychodrama transferred to the Traverse Theatre for the Edinburgh Fringe 2022. Nominated for an OffFest Award for Best Theatre.

References

External links

Year of birth missing (living people)
Living people
Alumni of RADA
British male television actors
British male film actors
British male voice actors